John the Grammarian can refer to:
John of Caesarea (theologian), the first neo-Chalcedonian theologian
John Philoponus, an early Byzantine philosopher
John VII of Constantinople,  Patriarch of Constantinople from January 21, 837 to March 4, 843